The Solomon Islands Football Federation is a member of the Oceania Football Confederation. The Solomon Islands national football team made history when they made it to the final Oceania stages of the 2006 World Cup Qualification against Australia. Before the tournament began it was almost presumed this place would go to New Zealand.

Staff

Divisions
Telekom S-League (Division 1)
Division 1 Football League (Division 2)
Former - Solomon Islands National Club Championship (2000-2010)

Cups 

 Solomon Cup
 Malaita Cup

Teams
These are the current teams of the 2015-16 Telekom S-League.
 Guadalcanal (Honiara)
 Hana (Honiara)
 Koloale (Honiara)
 KOSSA (Honiara)
 Malaita Kingz (Malaita)
 Marist (Honiara)
 Real Kakamora (Makira-Ulawa)
 Solomon Warriors (Honiara)
 Western United (Western)
 West Honiara (Honiara)

These are the current teams of the 2018 HFA Premier Division.
 Henderson Eels
 Solomon Warriors
 Hana
 G. Camp United
 CY Strikers
 Mars United
 Sokomora
 Junior Flamingo
 CDL Lekas
 Northern United
 Marist
 Realas
 Laugu United
 Waneagu
 Kossa
 Makuru
 Walas
 Naha

These are the current teams of the 2018 HFA Division 1
 Sunbeam
 Junior Warriors
 Islands
 Our Breeze
 KGVI Snails
 Juniper
 Maasina
 Saa United
 Koloale
 Rangers
 Three United
 Las United
 Toba Kingz
 DMP
 Kukum Bombers
 Lau Valley
 Solomon Sheet Steel
 Kolei United

References

External links
 Solomon Islands Football Federation (official)
 Solomon Islands at FIFA site
 Solomon Islands at OFC site
 Solomon Islands Football Federation (Sporting Pulse)

National members of the Oceania Football Confederation
Football in the Solomon Islands
Sports organizations established in 1979